Randall Otis Nix (born June 19, 1952) is a Republican member of the Georgia House of Representatives for the 69th district. This district encompasses parts of Carroll County, Heard County, and Troup County.

Biography
Randy Nix was born on June 19, 1956. He graduated from Troy State University with a B.S. degree in Business, and later from the Southern Trust School as well. Randy and his wife, Debra, have two daughters: Jess (an attorney in Birmingham, Alabama) and Julie (a Marine reservist and nursing student).

Nix served 5 years as a chaplain's assistant in the U.S. Army Reserve. He later served 7 years in the Alabama Air National Guard. Nix is a pastor at the Hillcrest United Methodist Church in LaGrange. Nix also acts as a motivational speaker.

As a member of the Georgia House, Nix belongs to the following committees: Banks and Banking, Education, Economic Development and Tourism, Judiciary, and Natural Resources and Environment (Secretary).

In 2021, Nix proposed legislation that would strip power from bipartisan local election boards in Georgia and hand it over to a board composed primarily of Republicans.

References

External links
Representative Randy Nix, Georgia House of Representatives

Living people
1956 births
Republican Party members of the Georgia House of Representatives
Troy University alumni
People from LaGrange, Georgia
21st-century American politicians